Alastor simillimus is a species of wasp in the family Vespidae.

References

simillimus
Insects described in 1983